Eri Klas (7 June 1939 – 26 February 2016) was an Estonian conductor. 

Klas was born into a Jewish family in Tallinn. His mother was pianist Anna Klas. His father, Eduard Klas, was killed in 1941, during the Holocaust. Klas mainly worked in the Nordic scene, but might be best remembered for his work leading the now defunct Netherlands Radio Symphony Orchestra. From 1999 to 2001 Klas was music advisor to the Israel Sinfonietta Beersheba, Israel.

He premiered Alfred Schnittke's 1st Cello Concerto (Munich Philharmonic, 1986) and Peer Gynt ballet (Hamburg State Opera, 1989), and worked on the diffusion of the Estonian symphonic repertory.

Klas was also active as a pedagogue, holding professorships at the Sibelius Academy (1993–97) and the Estonian Academy of Music and Theatre (1997 until his death), where he received an honorary doctorate.

Klas was decorated with the Order of the Lion of Finland (1992, on the occasion of Finland's 75th Independence Day) and the Estonian Order of the White Star. He was a UNICEF Goodwill Ambassador. In 1986, he was named the People's Artist of the USSR. An Estonian lightweight junior boxing champion, he was also a member of the Estonian Olympic Committee.

From 1972 until 1991, he was married to ballet dancer, singer and actress Ülle Ulla.

References

External links

Estonian National Cultural Foundation page on Eri Klas
Tampere Philharmonic Orchestra page on Eri Klas
Jewish Community in Estonia, February 2006 bulletin
 

1939 births
2016 deaths
Estonian conductors (music)
People's Artists of the USSR
Order of the Polar Star
Recipients of the Order of the Lion of Finland
Estonian Jews
Musicians from Tallinn
Estonian Academy of Music and Theatre alumni
Academic staff of the Estonian Academy of Music and Theatre
Recipients of the Order of the White Star, 3rd Class
Estonian music educators